Mellieħa Redoubt was a redoubt in Mellieħa, Malta. It was built by the Order of Saint John in 1715–1716 as one of a series of coastal fortifications around the Maltese Islands. The redoubt was demolished in the 19th century.

History

Mellieħa Redoubt was built in 1715–1716 as part of the first building programme of coastal fortifications in Malta. It was part of a chain of fortifications that defended Mellieħa Bay, which also included Fedeau and Westreme Batteries and several entrenchments.

Construction of the Mellieħa Redoubt cost about 1644 scudi. It consisted of a pentagonal platform with a low parapet, with rectangular blockhouse located at the centre of its gorge. It was one of the few redoubts which were armed with artillery, and it had four 6-pounder guns in 1770. The gunpowder was stored in the nearby Saint Agatha's Tower.

The redoubt was demolished in the early 19th century to make way for the road leading from Mellieħa to Ċirkewwa. Its stones were used to build the road.

See also
Crivelli Redoubt
Qortin Redoubt
Tal-Bir Redoubt

References

Redoubts in Malta
Mellieħa
Hospitaller fortifications in Malta
Military installations established in 1715
Demolished buildings and structures in Malta
Buildings and structures demolished in the 19th century
Limestone buildings in Malta
18th-century fortifications
1715 establishments in Malta
18th Century military history of Malta